William Branch Giles (August 12, 1762December 4, 1830; the g is pronounced like a j) was an American statesman, long-term Senator from Virginia, and the 24th Governor of Virginia. He served in the House of Representatives from 1790 to 1798 and again from 1801 to 1803; in between, he was a member of the Virginia House of Delegates and was an Elector for Jefferson (and Aaron Burr) in 1800. He served as a United States Senator from 1804 to 1815 and then served briefly in the House of Delegates again. After a time in private life, he joined the opposition to John Quincy Adams and Henry Clay in 1824; he ran for the Senate again in 1825 and was defeated but appointed Governor for three one-year terms in 1827; he was succeeded by John Floyd, in the year of his death.

Biography
He was born and died in Amelia County, where he built his home, The Wigwam. Giles attended Prince Edward Academy, now Hampden–Sydney College, and the College of New Jersey, now Princeton University; he probably followed Samuel Stanhope Smith, who was teaching at Prince Edward Academy when he was appointed President of the College in 1779. He then went on to study law with Chancellor George Wythe and at the College of William and Mary; he was admitted to the bar in 1786. Giles supported the new Constitution during the ratification debates of 1788 but was not a member of the ratifying convention.

Giles was elected to the U.S. House of Representatives in a special election in 1790, taking the seat of Theodorick Bland, who had died in office on June 1; he is believed to be the first member of the United States Congress to be elected in a special election. He was to be re-elected three times; he resigned on October 2, 1798, on the grounds of ill health and in disgust at the Alien and Sedition Acts.

During this first period in Congress, he fervently supported his fellow Virginians James Madison and Thomas Jefferson against Alexander Hamilton and his ideas for a national bank preferring Jefferson's idea of an agrarian republic. Working with Jefferson and Madison, he introduced three sets of resolutions in 1793, which attempted to censure Hamilton's "administration of finances" as Secretary of the Treasury to the point of accusing him of maladministration in office under the Funding Act of 1790 to force the US to repay America's debts to France following the French Revolution. Per this goal, he opposed the pro-British Jay's Treaty and resisted naval appropriation to be used against France during the Quasi-War. In the same year, he voted for the Kentucky and Virginia Resolutions in the House of Delegates to declare the Alien and Sedition Acts unconstitutional.

After another term in the House, from 1801 to 1803, Giles was appointed as a Senator from Virginia after the resignation of Wilson Cary Nicholas in 1804. Giles served in the US Senate and was reappointed in 1810 until he resigned on March 3, 1815. Giles strongly advocated the removal of Justice Samuel Chase after his impeachment, urging the Senate to consider it as a political decision (as to whether the people of the United States should have confidence in Chase) rather than as a trial.

Giles was deeply disappointed by the acquittal of Chase. He supported the election of Madison as president in 1808, in preference to the Federalist's candidate Charles Cotesworth Pinckney. Giles was Madison's chief advocate in Virginia.

After the election, however, he joined with Senator Samuel Smith of Maryland and his brother Robert Smith, the Secretary of State, in criticizing Madison; first as too weak on Britain and then, in 1812, as too precipitate in going to war; however, voted for the declaration of war. He disliked Albert Gallatin, the Secretary of the Treasury, who was primarily responsible for preventing his nomination as Secretary of State and defeating Gallatin's bill of 1811 for a new Bank of the United States.

Giles's refusal to accept the General Assembly's instructions led to his rejection at the next poll for a senator. (The state legislatures elected senators in those days.) Giles served one relatively uneventful term in the Virginia House of Delegates in 1816–1817 and then retired from political office for a time. He, however, published opinion pieces and columns, chiefly in the Richmond, Virginia, Enquirer, in which he deplored the Era of Good Feelings as false prosperity, given over to banks, tariffs, and fraudulent internal improvements; these would centralize and corrupt government, and ruin the farmers. He attacked John Quincy Adams and Henry Clay as he had attacked Hamilton, calling them corrupt Anglophiles.

Giles also published a criticism of the Jeffersonian program for public education. Giles argued that it was unjust to tax one man to educate another man's children, and the teachers that the government employed would constitute a special interest, always ready to vote for higher taxes and government spending. Besides, he said, giving every boy in Virginia three years of school would have limited practical utility, deprive farm families of much-needed labor power, and leave the typical "scholar" unfitted for the return to hard labor that awaited him.

When James Barbour left the Senate in 1825, Giles attempted to persuade the legislature to appoint him as a replacement; they appointed John Randolph instead. In 1826, Giles was again elected to the House of Delegates, and in 1827 he was elected Governor; Giles served as Governor of Virginia for three terms, from March 4, 1827, to March 4, 1830. From the governorship, Giles encouraged Virginia's Senator Littleton Waller Tazewell to organize a southern resistance to the American System of Henry Clay centered on a boycott on northern manufactures. Tazewell found little support for it among southern senators.

In Giles's last term, he was a member of the Virginia Constitutional Convention of 1829–1830 where he strongly supported the existing apportionment of the House of Delegates, giving the eastern counties of Virginia, with a minority of the voters, control of the legislature. He did favor reform of the suffrage requirements, however. Giles also opposed the movement in the convention to strengthen his own office, the governorship. Strong governorships in other states, such as New York, were at the center of political machines kept together by patronage and corruption, he said, and the reason that Virginia had not suffered from those ills was that the governorship in his state was too weak to be worth fighting for. Rather than follow the example of New York, with its party machine, it was better for Virginia to retain George Mason's executive model. Giles lost to some extent: while the governor's term remained short and was still accountable to the General Assembly, the Constitution of 1830 abolished the privy council, thus making the governorship a bit more independent.

Legacy
Giles married twice; first, Martha Peyton Tabb, in 1797; he built his 18-room house, "The Wigwam," for her.  They had three children. After she died in 1808, he married Frances Ann Gwynn in 1810 and had three more children.

Counties in two states were named in his honor: Giles County, Virginia and Giles County, Tennessee. His name also graces a residence hall at the College of William and Mary.

The Wigwam was added to the National Register of Historic Places in 1969.

References

F. Thornton Miller, "Giles, William Branch"; American National Biography Online, Feb. 2000. Access Date: Wed November 26, 16:23:26 EST 2008 (link requires subscription
W. Frank Craven, "William Branch Giles" in Princetonians, 1776–1783; a Biographical Dictionary, Princeton University Press, 1981.

Further reading
Dice Anderson, William Branch Giles; A Study in the Politics of Virginia and the Nation from 1790 to 1830, George Banta, 1914 and William Branch Giles, a Life, George Banta, 1915.
Mary A. Giunta, The Public Life of William Branch Giles, Republican, 1790–1815, Ph.D. dissertation, Catholic University, 1980. For some reason, this study leaves off before Giles' editorial and gubernatorial career.
Kevin R. C. Gutzman, Virginia's American Revolution:  From Dominion to Republic, 1776–1840, Lexington Books, 2007.
Kevin R. C. Gutzman, "Preserving the Patrimony:  William Branch Giles and Virginia vs. The Federal Tariff," ''The Virginia Magazine of History and Biography" 104 (Summer 1996), 341–72.

External links

A Guide to the Governor William B. Giles Executive Papers, 1827–1830 at The Library of Virginia

1762 births
1830 deaths
Democratic Party governors of Virginia
United States senators from Virginia
Democratic Party members of the Virginia House of Delegates
Hampden–Sydney College alumni
Princeton University alumni
College of William & Mary alumni
Democratic-Republican Party United States senators
People from Amelia, Virginia
Democratic-Republican Party members of the United States House of Representatives from Virginia
Virginia colonial people